Bernard Boucault (born 17 July 1948) is a French public official. He was previously director of the École nationale d'administration. He was head of the Paris police from 2012 until 2015. He has been involved in several high-profile police actions, involving protestors in 2013 and the Football Championship of France concerning Paris Saint-Germain F.C. in 2013.

Personal life 
Boucault was attacked in 2014. In 2016, several French government officials were banned from Wikipedia for attempting to modify his biography.

Awards 
 Commandeur of the Légion d'honneur
 Officer of the National Order of Merit

References

External links 
 Site de l'ENA
 Bernard Boucault at Who's Who in France

French civil servants
1948 births
Living people
Commandeurs of the Légion d'honneur
Officers of the Ordre national du Mérite